First of the Big Bands is a studio album by Tony Ashton of Ashton, Gardner and Dyke and Jon Lord of Deep Purple, released in April 1974 by Purple Records in the UK and Europe and Warner Bros. Records in the US. The project was Ashton's and Lord's brainchild and continuation of their working relationship after Ashton Gardner & Dyke helped out on Jon Lord's soundtrack album The Last Rebel from 1971. Stylistically, First of the Big Bands was the precursor to Paice Ashton Lord's Malice in Wonderland album from 1977. Most of the album was recorded at Air and Apple Studios, London, with additional work being completed at De Lane Lea and Island.

First of the Big Bands resulted in just two live performances, one of which was for the BBC. This was issued in 1993 as First of the Big Bands - BBC Live in Concert 1974.

In November 2010 a remastered edition of the album was released by Purple Records. It contains two bonus tracks – the single B-side "Sloeback" and an alternative version of "Down Side Upside Down".

Track listing

Personnel

Personnel
 Tony Ashton - Lead vocals, Hammond organ, piano
 Jon Lord - Hammond organ, piano
 Mick Clarke - guitars
 Jim Cregan - guitars
 Jerry Donahue - guitars
 Peter Frampton - guitars
 Pat Donaldson - bass
 Dave Caswell - trumpet
 Mike Davis - trumpet
 John Mumford - trombone
 Dick Parry - saxophone
 Howie Casey - saxophone
 Carmine Appice - drums
 Terry Cox - drums
 Ian Paice - drums
 Cozy Powell - drums
 Frank Ricotti - percussion, vibraphone
 Madeline Bell - backing vocals
 Tony Ferguson - backing vocals
 Jimmy Helms - backing vocals
 Kenny Rowe - backing vocals
 Graham White - backing vocals
 Jo Ann Williams - backing vocals
 Roger Willis - backing vocals

Technical

 Engineered by Martin Birch, Geoffrey Emerick, Alan Harris, John Middleton, John Mills and Bill Price
 Produced by Tony Ashton and Jon Lord
John Kosh - cover design
Peter Howe - photography

References

1974 albums
Purple Records albums
Warner Records albums
Albums recorded at Apple Studios
Deep Purple